Erland Frederick Fish (December 7, 1883 – February 18, 1942) was a Massachusetts lawyer and politician who served as President of the Massachusetts Senate from 1933 to 1934.

Biography
Fish was born on December 7, 1883.  Fish graduated from Harvard College and then Harvard Law School in 1908.

Starting in 1908, he clerked for a year for Justice Oliver Wendell Holmes, Jr. at the U.S. Supreme Court. Afterwards, he worked for Gaston, Snow & Saltonstall, and later his family patent law firm, Fish, Richardson & Neave, in Boston.

In 1909, Fish joined the Massachusetts National Guard and served as captain in the 101st Field Artillery Regiment in France during WW I. From 1930 to 1934 he was the commanding general of the 26th Infantry Division, also known as the Yankee Division.

On February 18, 1942, Fish died at age 59 after he was hit by a taxicab in Boston.

See also 
 List of law clerks of the Supreme Court of the United States (Seat 2)
 Massachusetts legislature: 1920, 1921–1922, 1923–1924, 1925–1926, 1927–1928, 1929–1930, 1931–1932, 1933–1934, 1935–1936

References

External links
Generals of World War II

1883 births
1942 deaths
Harvard Law School alumni
Republican Party Massachusetts state senators
Presidents of the Massachusetts Senate
Massachusetts National Guard personnel
Massachusetts lawyers
Politicians from Brookline, Massachusetts
Republican Party members of the Massachusetts House of Representatives
National Guard (United States) generals
Law clerks of the Supreme Court of the United States
Pedestrian road incident deaths
20th-century American politicians
20th-century American lawyers
United States Army personnel of World War I
United States Army generals of World War II
United States Army generals
Road incident deaths in Massachusetts